Jure Brkljača (born 21 September 1994) is a Croatian singer. He is known for placing fourth in season one of The Voice Hrvatska.

Early life
Brkljača was born in Zadar, Croatia on 21 September 1994.

Music career
Starting 31 January 2015, Jure Brkljača appeared as a contestant on the first season of the reality talent show The Voice Hrvatska. On the first show, Brkljača sang Oliver Dragojević's song "Brod u boci". All four judges, Jacques Houdek, Indira Levak, Tony Cetinski and Ivan Dečak turned around with Levak, Cetinski and Dečak giving him a standing ovation. Brkljača eventually chose Tony Cetinski as his coach. On 21 February 2015, in the Battle Round, Brkljača's coach Cetinski put him against Romana Lalić Pejković choosing that they both sing "Stine", originally by Oliver Dragojević. As a result, Cetinski picked him to continue his journey into the live shows. On 28 March 2015, Brkljača sang Indexi's song "Bacila je sve niz rijeku". During the Top 16, Brkljača sang a rendition of "Još i danas zamiriše trešnja". In the Top 12, he sang Zlatan Stipišić Gibonni's "Posoljeni zrak i razlivena tinta". At the semi-final on 18 April 2015, Brkljača performed Mišo Kovač's "Ti si mi u krvi" and advanced to the final. At the finals, Brkljača sang the song "Ti, samo ti" along with his coach Tony Cetinski, he also re-sang his audition song "Brod u boci". He finished fourth overall.

On 5 October 2015, Brkljača released his debut single "Druga strana". On 17 January 2019, he was announced as one of the 16 participants in Dora 2019, the national contest in Croatia to select the country's Eurovision Song Contest 2019 entry, with the song "Ne postojim kad nisu tu". He finished the competition as eighth with a total of seven points. Followed by the performance on Dora 2019 the song peaked at number three in Croatia. In late 2019 Brkljača applied for Dora 2020 with the song "Hajde, nazovi me!" and was chosen as one of the contestants on 23 December 2019.

Discography

Studio albums

Singles

References

External links

21st-century Croatian male singers
Living people
1994 births
Croatian pop singers
Croatian pop musicians
Musicians from Zadar